David Turner (born February 19, 1967 in Washington, D.C.) is a former gridiron player in the Canadian Football League. He was a defensive back primarily used as a kick return specialist with the Winnipeg Blue Bombers and Ottawa Rough Riders.  Turner was undrafted out of East Texas State University where he excelled in Track and Field, skipping his senior season of football, but entering the C.F.L. as a free-agent with the Blue Bombers in 1989 and dealt to the Rough Riders in 1990.

References 

Living people
Canadian football defensive linemen
1967 births